Beer in the Netherlands includes pale lagers, especially Bavaria, Heineken and Grolsch, that are consumed globally. Heineken is the world's second-largest brewer of beer, after Anheuser-Busch InBev, since the latter acquired competitor SABMiller in 2016. Bavaria is active in more than 130 countries, in particular in Asia and the Middle East.

While pale lager makes up the majority of beer production and consumption in the Netherlands, most Dutch brewers also brew specials. The most common specials are witbier (wheat beer) and Bok, brewed in Autumn and Spring, a tradition closely related to German Bock.

The Netherlands exports the largest beer of any country in the world – approximately 50% of production. In 2004, almost 1,300 million litres were exported out of a total production of 2,300 million litres.

Breweries

There are three major brewery companies in the Netherlands: Heineken (also brews Amstel), Grolsch, and Bavaria. Belgian breweries also take part in the market. Inbev for example sells Jupiler, Dommelsch, and Oranjeboom in the Dutch market. According to the Centraal Brouwerij Kantoor, Heineken controls about fifty percent of the market and the other three fifteen percent each. Between the them, the large companies operate eight breweries. In addition to the multinationals, there are five independent lager breweries and around forty five small, new microbreweries and brewpubs. A dozen other companies own no brewing plant themselves and have their beers brewed by third parties in the Netherlands or Belgium. The new breweries mostly brew top-fermenting beers roughly similar to those from Belgium. In addition there are also examples of British-style ales and traditional lagers.

The Dutch province, North Brabant, is home to two of the ten Trappist Breweries. The monks that run the Koningshoeven Brewery in Berkel-Enschot brew several beers, mostly branded La Trappe, and has been active since 1884, while the De Kievit brewery of the Zundert abbey was only founded in 2013 and brews a beer named Zundert. The four classics La Trappe Trappist beers are awarded with Golden European Beer stars in 2018. La Trappe Blond did won a Golden award in the World Beer Cup 2016. It was chosen as winner out of 6600 other international beers. 

Some beers have their own regional consumption base. Bavaria, Budels and Dommelsch are popular in North Brabant. Grolsch is a favourite in the eastern province Overijssel.

See also
List of Dutch breweries

References

External links
Centraal Brouwerij Kantoor
The Brewers of Europe